The Sherrard Falls is a cascade waterfall on an unnamed stream that is located in the New England region of New South Wales, Australia.

Location and features
The bridge across Sherrard Falls is one lane. Vehicular and pedestrian access and viewing of the Sherrard Falls is difficult due to no car parking on the narrow Waterfall Way. The Waterfall Way is subject to closure at Sherrard Falls and Newell Falls in times of high rain, due to flooding over the road.

See also

List of waterfalls of Australia

References

 
 

Waterfalls of New South Wales
New England (New South Wales)
Cascade waterfalls
Waterfalls of the Waterfall Way
Bellingen Shire